Richard FitzAlan, 1st Earl of Arundel (3 February 1267 – 9 March 1302) was an English nobleman and soldier.

Lineage 

He was the son of John Fitzalan III and Isabella Mortimer, daughter of Roger Mortimer, 1st Baron Wigmore and Maud de Braose. His paternal grandparents were John Fitzalan II and Maud le Botiller.

Richard was feudal Lord of Clun and Oswestry in the Welsh Marches. In 1289 he was created Earl of Arundel.

He was knighted by King Edward I of England in 1289.

Fought in Wales, Gascony & Scotland 

He fought in the Welsh wars, 1288 to 1294, when the Welsh castle of Castell y Bere (near modern-day Towyn) was besieged by Madog ap Llywelyn. He commanded the force sent to relieve the siege and he also took part in many other campaigns in Wales ; also in Gascony 1295-97; and furthermore in the Scottish wars, 1298-1300.

Marriage and children 

He married sometime before 1285, Alice of Saluzzo (also known as Alesia di Saluzzo), daughter of Thomas I of Saluzzo in Italy.
Their issue:
Edmund Fitzalan, 2nd Earl of Arundel.
 John, a priest.
Alice Fitzalan, married Stephen de Segrave, 3rd Lord Segrave.
Margaret Fitzalan, married William le Botiller (or Butler).
Eleanor FitzAlan, married Henry de Percy, 1st Baron Percy.

Burial 

Richard and his mother are buried together in the sanctuary of Haughmond Abbey, long closely associated with the FitzAlan family.

Notes

References

Sources

External links 
 Medieval Lands Project on Richard FitzAlan

|-

1267 births
1302 deaths
Anglo-Normans
Burials at Haughmond Abbey
08
Richard
Norman warriors